Ricky Memphis (stage name of Riccardo Fortunati; born 29 August 1968)  is an Italian television and film actor. He is best known for his interpretation of Inspector Mauro Belli, in the police drama series, Distretto di Polizia ('Police Precinct'), which was broadcast weekly for eight seasons by Italian network Canale 5 from 2000 to 2009.

Career 
Ricky Memphis was born in Rome. His career in the entertainment business began at the end of the 1980s with his first television appearance as an urban poet on the Maurizio Costanzo talk show. He chose his stage name "Memphis" in honour of American singer Elvis Presley.

His first role in a major picture was in the 1990 film Ultrà, directed by Ricky Tognazzi. Memphis won the award for Best Supporting Actor for his portrayal of Red at the European Film Awards.

He followed with roles in Pugni di rabbia, La scorta and Il branco. Memphis received national popularity with his interpretation of the compassionate Inspector Mauro Belli in Mediaset's Canale 5 television police drama series Distretto di Polizia ('Police District'), which aired for eight seasons from 26 September 2000 to November 2009. His character left the series in the sixth season of the series. There was talk of Memphis returning to the series in his former role of Inspector Mauro Belli.
Memphis's television work also includes the Canale 5/Italia 1 production of Crimini bianchi ('White Crimes'), in which he played the role of lawyer Claudio Bruni, and Rai Uno's Caccia al re - La Narcotici in 2011.

Filmography

Film

Ultra (1991)
Pugni di rabbia (1991)
The Escort (1993)
Briganti - Amore e libertà (1993)
The Heroes (1994)
Il branco (1994)
L'anno prossimo... Vado a letto alle dieci (1995)
Palermo - Milan One Way (1995)
Strangled Lives (1995)
Other Men (1997)
Kaputt Mundi (1998)
We'll Really Hurt You (1998)
S.O.S. (1999)
Paz! (2002)
Milan - Palermo: The Return (2007)
La bella società (2010)
The Immature (2011)
Ex 2: Still Friends? (2011)
Vacanze di Natale a Cortina (2011)
The Immature: The Trip (2012)
Us in the U.S. (2012)
The Fifth Wheel (2013)
The Move of The Penguin (2013)
A Fairy-Tale Wedding (2014)
Soap Opera (2014)
Ma tu di che segno sei? (2014)
Torno indietro e cambio vita (2015)
Miami Beach (2016)
Ovunque tu sarai (2017)
Sconnessi (2018)
Loro (2018)
Natale a cinque stelle (2018)
Don't Stop Me Now (2019)
Il grande salto (2019)
Parasite (2020)
Lockdown all'italiana (2020)

Television
1998: Ultimo (TV Movie) - Solo
1999: Ultimo II - La sfida (TV Movie) - Solo
1999: Excellent Cadavers (TV Movie) - Mafioso #1
1999: Il morso del serpente (TV Movie) - Sante Venuti
2000-2006: Distretto di Polizia - Ispettore capo Mauro Belli
2001: Sindone - 24 ore, 14 ostaggi (TV Movie) - Alberto
2008: Crimini bianchi ('White Crime') - Avvocato Claudio Bruni
2010: Un paradiso per due (A Paradise For Two) (TV Movie) - Nerone
2011: Caccia al re - La Narcotici - Livio Vitale
2011: Come un delfino (TV Movie) - Don Luca

Short
1998: Taxi
2005: Storia di Mario - Ricky

References 

1968 births
20th-century Italian male actors
Italian male film actors
Italian male television actors
Living people
European Film Awards winners (people)
Male actors from Rome
21st-century Italian male actors